Arístides Fabián Rojas Aranda (born 1 August 1970) is a former Paraguayan footballer who played as a striker.

He represented Paraguay at the 1998 FIFA World Cup. At club level he played for Club Guaraní, Olimpia Asunción, Club Atlético Colegiales (all from Paraguay), Aalst (Belgium), RC Lens (France), Independiente and Unión de Santa Fe (Argentina).

Rojas was the Paraguayan 1st Division top goalscorer in 1996, playing for Guarani.

External links
 

1970 births
Living people
Paraguayan footballers
Club Guaraní players
Club Olimpia footballers
Club Atlético Independiente footballers
Unión de Santa Fe footballers
Expatriate footballers in Argentina
RC Lens players
UD Las Palmas players
Paraguay international footballers
1998 FIFA World Cup players
Paraguayan expatriate footballers
1997 Copa América players
USL Dunkerque players
Association football forwards